Chung To (杜聰) is a Chinese AIDS activist, co-founder of the Chi Heng (= wisdom in action) Foundation (CHF). He was awarded the 2007 Ramon Magsaysay Award for Emergent Leadership (shared with Chen Guangcheng).

Chung received his bachelor's degree from Columbia University and master's degree from Harvard University.

Mr Chung To was born in Hong Kong with Cantonese heritage.

References

Chinese activists
HIV/AIDS activists
Ramon Magsaysay Award winners
Living people
Year of birth missing (living people)
Columbia University alumni
Harvard University alumni